National Chemistry Week (NCW) is an annual event held in the United States to raise public awareness of the importance of chemistry in everyday life. It is coordinated by the American Chemical Society (ACS).

NCW is a community-based program that unites ACS local sections, businesses, schools, and individuals in communicating the importance of chemistry to our quality of life.

NCW has won the American Society of Association Executives' Award for Excellence. More than 10,000 volunteers and dozens of chemical companies donate their time, creativity, materials and funds for NCW each year, and reach many millions of Americans via print, radio, television, and the internet, as well as in person.

Origins
National Chemistry Day, first celebrated in 1987  by members of the American Chemical Society (ACS), educators and other individual volunteers, was a vision of the former ACS President Dr. George C. Pimentel. His goal was for ACS to hold a simultaneous event nationwide to impress on the public the importance of chemistry in everyday life. The first celebration was kicked off with a parade down the streets in Washington, D.C.

In 1989 the celebration was expanded to a biannual full-week event, and in 1993 National Chemistry Week became an annual celebration.

Themes
Past and future themes for NCW include:

References
Celebrating Chemistry is designed to engage and educate children (Grades 4th - 6th) in the basic principles of chemistry and are available in both English and Spanish. Most editions are aligned with either National Chemistry Week (NCW) or Chemists Celebrate Earth Week (CCEW) and contain articles, experiments, and puzzles based on each year’s themes. Below you can also find special Celebrating Chemistry Editions for both NCW and CCEW, which were also inspired by the 2011 International Year of Chemistry.

External links

 National Chemistry Week web site

Awareness weeks in the United States
American Chemical Society
October observances
Chemistry education